Launceston College is a coeducational secondary school and sixth form with academy status, located in Launceston, Cornwall, England.

History
Launceston College was first established in 1409 and became a boys' grammar school with boarding house. In 1962, Horwell Grammar School for Girls, located at Dunheved Road, Newport. Launceston, merged with the college and in 1965 the former Pennygillam School was added to form the present day comprehensive school which is still known as Launceston College.

Since some time in the 19th century the college has been located at the southern end of Dunheved Road, approximately one kilometre from the town centre. It was designated a Technology College in 1998, and converted to academy status in 2013. The logo of the college is based on Launceston Castle a major landmark in the town. It is now fully inclusive and educating students aged 11 to 18 or 19.

In 1966 Henry Spencer Toy, its principal, published his A History of Education at Launceston detailing the development of education in the town and surrounding area.

A former student of the last-mentioned college is actor Sir Roger Moore. In 1962, Horwell Grammar School for Girls, Dunheved Road, was merged with the school, and in 1965 the former Pennygillam School was added to form the present-day comprehensive school, which is still known as Launceston College. Since the 19th century (exact date unknown) the college has been at the southern end of Dunheved Road, approximately one kilometre from the town centre. In 1966 H. Spencer Toy, its principal, published A History of Education at Launceston detailing the development of education in the town and surrounding area.

Athena Learning Trust
The school is governed by the Athena Learning Trust, a multi academy trust that also controls Bideford College, Altarnun Primary School, Launceston Primary School, Egloskerry Primary School and Atlantic Academy.

Notable former pupils
Charles Causley, Cornish poet and writer (born in Launceston).
Donald Fear and Davyth Fear, winners on 'Who wants to be a millionaire?'
Roger Moore, British actor (educated during World War II following evacuation from Battersea).
Albert Sloman, first Vice-Chancellor of the University of Essex
Sir Alan Tuckett, educationalist.

References

External links

.

Secondary schools in Cornwall
Academies in Cornwall
Launceston, Cornwall